Palpopleura lucia, the Lucia Widow, is a species of dragonfly in the family Libellulidae. It is found in Angola, Benin, Botswana, Burkina Faso, Cameroon, Central African Republic, Chad, Comoros, the Democratic Republic of the Congo, Ivory Coast, Equatorial Guinea, Ethiopia, Gabon, Gambia, Ghana, Guinea, Kenya, Liberia, Madagascar, Malawi, Mozambique, Namibia, Nigeria, São Tomé and Príncipe, Sierra Leone, Somalia, South Africa, Sudan, Tanzania, Togo, Uganda, Zambia, Zimbabwe, and possibly Burundi. Its natural habitats are subtropical or tropical moist lowland forests, subtropical or tropical dry shrubland, rivers, intermittent rivers, shrub-dominated wetlands, swamps, freshwater lakes, intermittent freshwater lakes, freshwater marshes, intermittent freshwater marshes, and freshwater springs.

References

Libellulidae
Taxonomy articles created by Polbot
Insects described in 1773
Taxa named by Dru Drury